Saint Pius X College is an all-boys, private, Roman
Catholic secondary school in Bodo City, Gokana, Rivers State. Founded in February 1956, Saint Pius X College is located within the Roman Catholic Diocese of Port Harcourt. The school is governed by a board of three members which consists of the director, secretary and principal. Former students have formed an association known as the Old Boys Association of Saint Pius X College.

Admission
The school's admission period spans between January and May in which three consecutive exams are conducted. Forms can be obtained through the school authority or the
Catholic Education Council Office in D-line, Port Harcourt. Only male students for JSS1 & 2 as well as SSS1 & 2 classes are admitted. JSS1 applicants must have schooled up to Basic 5 and have written their First School Leaving Certificate Examination.

Notable alumni

Maurice Iwu, former INEC chairman
Magnus L. Kpakol, economist

References

External links

Roman Catholic Diocese of Port Harcourt
Boys' schools in Rivers State
Educational institutions established in 1956
Boarding schools in Rivers State
Secondary schools in Rivers State
1956 establishments in Nigeria